Senator Aldrich may refer to:

Chester Hardy Aldrich (1863–1924), Nebraska State Senate
Mark Aldrich (1802–1873), Illinois State Senate, and later Territorial Senate of Arizona
Nelson W. Aldrich (1841–1915), U.S. Senator from Rhode Island from 1881 to 1911
Richard S. Aldrich (1884–1941), Rhode Island State Senate

See also
Senator Aldridge (disambiguation)